Balderstone is a civil parish in Ribble Valley, Lancashire, England.  It contains five listed buildings that are recorded in the National Heritage List for England.  All of the listed buildings are designated at Grade II, the lowest of the three grades, which is applied to "buildings of national importance and special interest".  The parish contains the village of Balderstone, and is otherwise rural.  The listed buildings consist of two farmhouses, a farm building, a church, and a sundial in the churchyard.

Buildings

References

Citations

Sources

Lists of listed buildings in Lancashire
Buildings and structures in Ribble Valley